Sir Filoimea Telito  (19 March 1945 – 11 July 2011) was a political and religious figure from the Pacific nation of Tuvalu. He was born on Vaitupu where he attended Elisefou (New Ellice) primary school. He later attended King George V Secondary School in Tarawa, Kiribati.

Background

He served as principal of the Motufoua Secondary School on Vaitupu island, and was a pastor in the Church of Tuvalu (Ekalesia Klisiano Tuvalu), of which he eventually became the president, a position which he held until his death. In 1996, Telito was honoured for his services to education and the community by being made a Member of the Order of the British Empire (MBE).

Governor-General of Tuvalu

On 15 April 2005 he took office as Governor-General of Tuvalu as the representative of Elizabeth II, Queen of Tuvalu. He stepped down in 2010. In January 2007, Telito was made a Knight Grand Cross of Order of Saint Michael and Saint George (GCMG) by Queen Elizabeth II. Herewith he resumed the practice by Governors-General of Tuvalu of accepting a knighthood, a practice discontinued on a personal basis by his predecessor to that office, Faimalaga Luka.

Death

He died on 11 July 2011 of a heart attack, and was buried in Funafuti three days later. All government activity ceased on the day of the funeral, in a sign of respect.

References

1945 births
2011 deaths
Governors-General of Tuvalu
Knights Grand Cross of the Order of St Michael and St George
Members of the Order of the British Empire
People from Vaitupu
Tuvaluan Congregationalists
Tuvaluan religious leaders